Richard Loves Lucy is a Philippine sitcom on ABS-CBN. The show stars Richard Gomez and Lucy Torres. It aired from November 15, 1998 to March 25, 2001.

Cast

Main cast
Richard Gomez as Richard
Lucy Torres as Lucy
Kristine Hermosa
Jolina Magdangal
John Estrada
Willie Revillame
Gloria Romero

Supporting cast
 Wilma Doesnt
 Tintoy
 Berting Labra
 Whitney Tyson

See also
List of shows previously aired by ABS-CBN

ABS-CBN original programming
Philippine television sitcoms
1998 Philippine television series debuts
2001 Philippine television series endings
Filipino-language television shows